Max Brühwiler (born 8 March 1948) is a Swiss gymnast. He competed in eight events at the 1972 Summer Olympics.

References

1948 births
Living people
Swiss male artistic gymnasts
Olympic gymnasts of Switzerland
Gymnasts at the 1972 Summer Olympics
Place of birth missing (living people)